George Goldthwaite (December 10, 1809March 16, 1879) was an Alabama Supreme Court justice and U.S. senator for Alabama. He served in the Senate from March 4, 1871, to March 3, 1877, and did not run for reelection.

He was a native of Boston, Massachusetts. He succeeded William P. Chilton as Chief Justice of the Supreme Court of Alabama in 1856. State legislators from Alabama wrote to the U.S. Senate in protest of his election stating he did not receive a majority of the votes from state legislators and was therefore not elected legitimately. He was seated and remained in office.

A great-grandson, George G. Siebels, Jr., was a 20th-century mayor of Birmingham and a member of the Alabama House of Representatives. Another descendant, Alfred Goldthwaite, was a state representative from Montgomery and a state chairman of the Alabama Republican Party.

In 1853 he ruled that a freed woman in Ohio could be returned so slavery to satisfy the debts of her former owner but that her son could not.

References

External links

Alabama Department of Archives & History 

1810 births
1879 deaths
Chief Justices of the Supreme Court of Alabama
Democratic Party United States senators from Alabama
Politicians from Boston
Politicians from Montgomery, Alabama
Lawyers from Montgomery, Alabama
19th-century American politicians
19th-century American judges
19th-century American lawyers